Archie Marshall (born 23 October 1952) is a British speed skater. He competed at the 1976 Winter Olympics and the 1980 Winter Olympics.

References

1952 births
Living people
British male speed skaters
Olympic speed skaters of Great Britain
Speed skaters at the 1976 Winter Olympics
Speed skaters at the 1980 Winter Olympics
Sportspeople from Glasgow